is a 2014 Japanese fantasy comedy-drama film directed by Noriyoshi Sakuma. It is an adaptation of the NTV's drama My Little Nightmare premiered in 2012. The film was released on May 3, 2014.

Cast
 Keiko Kitagawa as Ayami Mutoi
 Manatsu Kimura as Yuiko Kotō
 Fumiyo Kohinata as Bannosuke Kotō
 Gackt as Takashi Shiki/Yume Ōji
 Yūka as Kotoha Hirashima

Reception

As of 11 May 2014, the film has grossed US$4,113,043 in Japan.

See also

My Little Nightmare

References

External links
 My Little Nightmare: The Movie at Nippon TV 
  

2014 films
2010s fantasy comedy-drama films
Nippon TV films
Japanese fantasy comedy-drama films
2010s Japanese films